= Phenomenal Woman =

Phenomenal Woman may refer to:

- A poem by Maya Angelou
- A 2012 single (song) by Geri Halliwell
